The 1925 Bulgarian State Football Championship was the second edition of the competition. It was contested by 6 teams, and Vladislav Varna won the championship by beating Levski Sofia 2–0 in the finals. They became the first football champions of Bulgaria.

Qualified teams
The teams that participated in the competition were the six winners of their local sport federations.

Quarter-finals

|}

Semi-finals

|}

Final

Notes

References
Bulgaria - List of final tables (RSSSF)

Bulgarian State Football Championship seasons
Bul
1